Kurilabyssia squamosa is a species of small sea snail, a marine gastropod mollusk in the family Pseudococculinidae, the false limpets.

References

External links
 To Encyclopedia of Life
 To World Register of Marine Species

Pseudococculinidae
Gastropods described in 1976